Soyuz MS-11 was a Soyuz spaceflight that launched on 3 December 2018, marking the 100th orbital launch of the year. Originally scheduled for 20 December, the launch date was advanced to 3 December following the failure of Soyuz MS-10. MS-11 was the 140th flight of a Soyuz spacecraft and carried the three members of the Expedition 58 crew to the International Space Station. The crew consisted of a Russian commander, and an American and a Canadian flight engineer.

Crew

Backup crew

References

Crewed Soyuz missions
2018 in Russia
Spacecraft launched in 2018
December 2018 events in Asia
Spacecraft launched by Soyuz-FG rockets
Spacecraft which reentered in 2019